José Bento (23 April 1882 – 5 October 1969) was a Spanish sports shooter. He competed in nine events at the 1920 Summer Olympics.

References

External links
 

1882 births
1969 deaths
Spanish male sport shooters
Olympic shooters of Spain
Shooters at the 1920 Summer Olympics
People from Placetas
20th-century Spanish people